Wang Pho railway station is a railway station located in Lumsum Subdistrict, Sai Yok District, Kanchanaburi Province.

References 

Railway stations in Thailand
Kanchanaburi province